Deidre McCalla is an American singer-songwriter from New York City. McCalla was raised around the folk music scene of Macdougal Street in New York, where she began her career. In the 1990s, she moved to northern California. She has released several albums on the women's music label Olivia Records.

She has worked with Teresa Trull, Mike Marshall, Linda Tillery, Bonnie Hayes, and other musicians. She has stated that she is a lesbian.

Discography
Fur Coats & Blue Jeans (Roulette Records, 1973)
Don't Doubt It (Olivia Records, 1985)
With a Little Luck (Olivia, 1987)
Everyday Heroes & Heroines (Olivia, 1992)
Playing for Keeps (MaidenRock, 2003)

References
Footnotes

Further reading
Laura Post, [ Deidre McCalla] at Allmusic

External links
Official Website

Year of birth missing (living people)
Living people
American women guitarists
American folk singers
American folk guitarists
American lesbian musicians
American LGBT singers
American LGBT songwriters
LGBT African Americans
Singer-songwriters from New York (state)
Vassar College alumni
African-American women singer-songwriters
Guitarists from New York (state)
Women's music
Gay singers
Gay songwriters
African-American guitarists
20th-century American LGBT people
21st-century American LGBT people
21st-century African-American women singers
20th-century African-American women singers